Rudolph B. Thompson (May 13, 1929 – April 24, 2010) was a sailor who represented the United States Virgin Islands. He competed in the Flying Dutchman event at the 1968 Summer Olympics.

References

External links
 
 

1929 births
2010 deaths
United States Virgin Islands male sailors (sport)
Olympic sailors of the United States Virgin Islands
Sailors at the 1968 Summer Olympics – Flying Dutchman
Sportspeople from Birmingham, Alabama